Samuel S. Lewis State Park is an  Pennsylvania state park in Lower Windsor Township, York County, Pennsylvania, in the United States. Mt. Pisgah is an  ridge that is the focus of recreation for the park. The ridge separates East Prospect Valley from Kreutz Creek Valley. An overlook on Mt. Pisgah gives visitors of view of the Susquehanna River Valley. Samuel S. Lewis Park is twelve miles (19 km) east of York near U.S. Highway 30.

History
The land on which Samuel S. Lewis Park came together from four different pieces of property. Samuel S. Lewis, the namesake of the park, donated his  farm to the Commonwealth of Pennsylvania in 1954. Walter Stein sold his  arboretum to the state in the same year. The state bought an additional  from the Almoney Farm to complete the initial parcel of park land. The last piece came into place in 1999 when the state purchased an additional  of land.

Recreation
Samuel S. Lewis State Park offers recreational opportunities for many visitors. Picnic tables are available on a first come first served basis and three pavilions may be reserved for day use. There is a one-mile (1.6 km) hiking trail through a pine forest bypassing some rock formations. The crest of Mt. Pisgah is ideal for kite flying. Kite flying clubs gather here to hone their skills and offer help to novice kite flyers.

Scenic view
Mt. Pisgah is the highest point in the area. The scenic view atop Mt. Pisgah offers a panoramic view of the surrounding towns, fields, and the Susquehanna River. It has become a popular spot for astronomical observation as clubs frequently hold star-gazing events at the overlook. The summit of Mt. Pisgah is also a popular site for weddings.

Nearby state parks
The following state parks are within  of Samuel S. Lewis State Park:
Codorus State Park (York County)
Gifford Pinchot State Park (York County)
Gunpowder Falls State Park (Maryland)
Rocks State Park (Maryland)
Susquehannock State Park (Lancaster County)

References

External links

  

State parks of Pennsylvania
Protected areas established in 1954
Parks in York County, Pennsylvania
Protected areas of York County, Pennsylvania